Japan competed at the 1960 Winter Olympics in Squaw Valley, United States.

Alpine skiing

Men

Cross-country skiing

Men

Men's 4 × 10 km relay

Figure skating

Men

Women

Ice hockey

Group A 
Top two teams (shaded ones) from each group advanced to the final round and played for 1st-6th places, other teams played in the consolation round.

Canada 19-1 Japan
Sweden 19-0 Japan

Consolation round 

Finland 6-6 Japan
Japan 13-2 Australia
Finland 11-2 Japan
Japan 11-3 Australia

Nordic combined 

Events:
 normal hill ski jumping (Three jumps, best two counted and shown here.)
 15 km cross-country skiing

Ski jumping

Speed skating

Men

Women

References
Official Olympic Reports
Japan Olympic Committee database
 Olympic Winter Games 1960, full results by sports-reference.com

Nations at the 1960 Winter Olympics
1960
Winter Olympics